The Henyey track  is a path taken by pre-main-sequence stars with masses greater than 0.5 solar masses in the Hertzsprung–Russell diagram after the end of the Hayashi track. The astronomer Louis G. Henyey and his colleagues in the 1950s showed that the pre-main-sequence star can remain in radiative equilibrium throughout some period of its contraction to the main sequence.

The Henyey track is characterized by a slow collapse in near hydrostatic equilibrium, approaching the main sequence almost horizontally in the Hertzsprung–Russell diagram (i.e. the luminosity remains almost constant).

See also
 Historical brightest stars
 List of brightest stars
 List of most luminous stars
 List of nearest bright stars
 List of Solar System objects in hydrostatic equilibrium
 Stellar evolution
 Stellar birthline
 Stellar isochrone

References

Stellar evolution
Hertzsprung–Russell classifications